Copiapoa marginata is a species of clump-forming cactus of South America.

It is native to the Atacama Desert in northern Chile.

Description

Subspecies and varieties
 Copiapoa marginata var. bridgesii
 Copiapoa marginata subsp. robustispina.

References
 
 

Cactoideae
Cacti of South America
Endemic flora of Chile
Flora of northern Chile
Atacama Desert
Near threatened flora of South America